Acrobasis diversicolor is a species of snout moth in the genus Acrobasis. It was described by Ragonot in 1893. It is found in South Africa.

References

Endemic moths of South Africa
Moths described in 1893
Acrobasis
Insects of South Africa
Moths of Africa